Phycitodes eliseannae is a species of snout moth. It is found in France and Spain.

References

Moths described in 2002
Phycitini
Moths of Europe